"Dilemma" is a song by American rapper Nelly, featuring singer Kelly Rowland. It was released on June 25, 2002, as the second single from Nelly's second studio album, Nellyville (2002), and as the first single from Rowland's debut solo studio album, Simply Deep (2002). A pop and R&B ballad, the song consists of a high-pitched intonation and call and response, and contains a sample of Patti LaBelle's 1983 song "Love, Need and Want You". The lyrics describe a man infatuated with a woman committed in an existing relationship. "Dilemma" was written by Nelly, Antoine "Bam" Macon and Ryan Bowser, alongside the "Love, Need and Want You" writers, Kenneth Gamble and Bunny Sigler.

"Dilemma" received generally favorable reviews from music critics, who praised the duet's emotional balance. It peaked at number one on the US Billboard Hot 100 for 10 non-consecutive weeks, after it replaced Nelly's previous single "Hot in Herre" on the chart. The song also topped the charts in the United Kingdom, Australia, Ireland, and Germany. "Dilemma" won an award for Best Rap/Sung Performance and was nominated for Record of the Year at the 45th Annual Grammy Awards. An accompanying music video was directed by Benny Boom and released in September 2002. It was filmed on Colonial Street with appearances by Larry Hughes and Patti LaBelle, and depicts Nelly attracted towards his new neighbor Rowland despite the latter being in a relationship.

Background and release
American producer Ryan Bowser created an instrumental which sampled and contained elements from Patti LaBelle's 1983 song "Love, Need and Want You", written by Kenneth Gamble and Bunny Sigler. Upon hearing the beat given to him by St. Louis producer Antoine "Bam" Macon, Nelly began writing lyrics for the track. He decided to include "Dilemma" as a last-minute addition on his second studio album Nellyville (2002), which was completed prior to Bam giving him the track. Once Nelly returned to the studio to record "Dilemma", he changed his vision to include a female vocalist. Nelly instantly thought of Destiny's Child member Kelly Rowland, whom he met during the Total Request Live (TRL) tour in 2001, and was encouraged by his sister to include her on the song. He called Rowland on the phone, who agreed to record the track. After a few days of recording, during which she re-recorded her part many times to achieve it "just right", "Dilemma" was completed.

Once Nellyville was released in June 2002, radio disc jockeys in the United States started playing "Dilemma". In July 2002, the track reached number eight of the Billboard Hot 100, after it charted at number 27 the previous week. This prompted Nelly to release the song as the album's second single although it was not the original plan. The decision affected the timetable for each Destiny's Child member since they were on hiatus and were expected to release a solo studio album. As part of their strategy, each of them were to be staggered, with member Beyoncé releasing one in October 2002, and Rowland's album expected in early 2003. Their management rescheduled the dates: Rowland released her debut solo album Simply Deep on October 28, 2002, which caused Beyoncé to delay her eventual album Dangerously in Love to June 2003.

Composition
Musically, "Dilemma" is a pop and R&B ballad. The "high-pitched intonation" used in the introduction prior to Rowland's vocals about "loving and needing Nelly" was initially rumored to be created on the Roland M-DC1 in 1995 as "Aaaah! (169)", which is used in over 135 songs. Bowser denied using the sample, insisting that he created the sound while experimenting with different vocal techniques. During the song's progression, the sound mellows as the production is "fleshed-out". Nelly raps during each verse while Rowland performs a "twinkling nursery-rhyme chorus". "Dilemma" is centered on Rowland's hook, "No matter what I do / All I think about is you / Even when I'm with my boo / Boy, you know I'm crazy over you", as Nelly responds with the line, "Check it, check it, check it, uh". The lyrics describe the love a man has for a woman committed in an existing relationship, the latter who is conflicted about abandoning. James Hannaham of The Village Voice additionally wrote that it is "an infidelity ballad" which combines mack daddy content with TRL.

Critical reception
AllMusic reviewer Jason Birchmeier noted that "Dilemma" is one of "three well-calculated, standout" tracks in the album. Vice writer Ryan Bassil opined that the song is "the best R&B duet of the modern age" in comparison to Jay-Z's 2002 song "'03 Bonnie & Clyde", stating that it had soul, passion, and feeling. In her review for Simply Deep, Caroline Sullivan of The Guardian wrote that it "practically peeled off its clothes on the spot", and Nathan Rabin of The A.V. Club commented that it "navigates the fine line separating sweet from saccharine". Spin staff member Andrew Unterberger called "Dilemma" a "puppy-love duet", while Blender staff described the song as a "capable ballad". However, Soren Baker of the Chicago Tribune stated that the "pseudo-ballad" lacked spunk and was "hardly worth the bother". Writing for The Washington Post, Arion Berger critiqued that the "neo-R&B" song was a "requisite lull" in his review of Nellyville.

"Dilemma" won a Grammy Award for Best Rap/Sung Performance at the 45th Annual Grammy Awards on February 23, 2003.

Commercial performance
"Dilemma" debuted on several Billboard charts on the week of July 6, 2002, at numbers 66 and 63 on the Hot R&B/Hip-Hop Songs and R&B/Hip-Hop Airplay charts respectively. The next week, it debuted at number 51 on the Radio Songs chart, as well as at number 53 on the Hot 100 during the same week. After four weeks, on the issue dated August 17, 2002, "Dilemma" peaked at number one on the Billboard Hot 100, where it stayed there for 10 weeks and remained on the chart for 29 weeks. With this song, Nelly replaced himself from the top of the chart, as his previous single "Hot In Herre" dropped to number two while "Dilemma" ascended from number two to number one. This surprised Nelly's record label, as they did not expect the song to instantly become popular and did not film a music video during its release. "Dilemma" topped the Mainstream Top 40 chart on the week of September 21, 2002. The song was ranked at number 11 on the Billboard Hot 100 decade-end list from 2000 to 2009, and placed at the number 75 position on the listicle of all-time songs to chart on the Billboard Hot 100.

On the UK Singles Chart dated October 26, 2002, "Dilemma" topped the chart, where it remained at the position for two weeks, before charting for 24 total weeks. The song sold 208,000 copies in the first week and 129,000 copies the following week, which prevented Justin Timberlake's 2002 debut solo single "Like I Love You" from the number one position. It was the fourth-best selling single in the United Kingdom in 2002, and was the 23rd highest-selling single in the country from 2000 to 2009. As of October 2016, "Dilemma" is the most successful song in both Nelly and Rowland's discographies. As of February 2021, the song has sold over 7 million copies worldwide.

Music video

Background
An accompanying music video for "Dilemma" was planned in July 2002, prior to its release as the second single from Nellyville. Nelly wanted the video to be "smooth" in contrast to his previous music videos, in order to emphasize on the storyline. It was directed by Benny Boom and filmed from August 19 to 21, 2002. The film set was located on Colonial Street, which was one of the backlot street sets located at Universal Studios Hollywood in the San Fernando Valley area of Los Angeles County, California. Then-Washington Wizards player Larry Hughes appeared in the video as Rowland's boyfriend, while Patti LaBelle was cast as her mother. The music video premiered at the end of MTV's Making the Video episode aired in September 2002.

Rowland described the plot, stating that she was "the new girl in the neighborhood" who became infatuated with Nelly living across the street despite having a partner and children, which resulted in a "dilemma". At one point in the video, Rowland is seen attempting to text Nelly on a spreadsheet application using her Nokia 9210 Communicator. Nelly defended the use of the application in an interview with Australian talk show The Project in November 2016, explaining that it was used during the time despite eventually becoming outdated. In subsequent interviews, Rowland admitted to not knowing what Microsoft Excel was, which elicited a response from the application's official Twitter account.

Synopsis
The music video introduces the fictional neighborhood of Nellyville, as the eponymous song is briefly heard. "Dilemma" begins as Nelly and Rowland sit on the front porch of their respective houses. Rowland and LaBelle portray a mother-daughter pair who have recently moved into the house opposite the street from Nelly, with the latter sporting a 4XL t-shirt and headband. They both greet each other as the moving van drives into Rowland's house. However, Rowland's boyfriend arrives and confronts her for communicating with Nelly, and they proceed to drive away. The next scene shows Nelly and Rowland encountering each other in a record shop. Rowland quickly exits upon noticing him while simultaneously appearing conflicted.

Rowland messages Nelly on her phone from inside her bedroom in another scene, as sequences of both musicians flirting together in front of a car are sporadically intercut. Rowland and her boyfriend queue inside a movie theater when Nelly walks opposite them with his girlfriend. They exchange glances while walking away from each other with their respective partners. In the final scene, LaBelle opens the front door of her house and repeatedly demands for her daughter to return inside, while the couple continue dancing outside throughout the night.

Reception
In a retrospective review, Ashley Perkins of Vibe acknowledged how the music video contained "just the right amount of dramatization to allow a glimpse into how much of a dilemma Nelly and Kelly's situationship was". She further explained that the narrative was explained "in a light other than from the perspective of the frustrated and faithful counterpart or the creeping side piece", which would later be replicated in songs such as "Situationships" by Fabolous, and "Distraction" by Kehlani. Bassil opined that the visuals contained "sartorial [color] coordination" and commented that Nelly's "dickhead"-styled clothing allowed him to dance alongside Rowland through the night.

On July 12, 2021, the music video reached one billion views on YouTube, which was Nelly and Rowland's first video to accomplish the feat. The achievement was the third hip hop music video released before the platform's existence to record one billion views, after "In da Club" by 50 Cent and "Without Me" by Eminem.

Remix and sequel

The official remix for "Dilemma" was produced by Jermaine Dupri, and features Rowland and Ali of the St. Lunatics. It was included on Nelly's remix album titled Da Derrty Versions: The Reinvention (2003). Writing in a review for the album for RapReviews.com, Steve Juon criticized the bass guitar in the remix and stated that the song "should have been left alone", while Katharina Lobeck of BBC opined that the original song "worked better" and is "more coherent" than the remix.

On December 16, 2009, Nelly recorded a new song titled "Gone" with Rowland, which he initially dubbed as "Dilemma Part 2". Nelly eventually retracted the statement, insisting that he did not want to replicate or diminish the original song but wanted to extend on the story and rekindle the chemistry he had with Rowland. "Gone" was written by Nelly, Rico Love, Earl Hood, Eric Goody II, and the producer Jim Jonsin. It was included on Nelly's sixth studio album 5.0 (2010), and distributed to urban contemporary radio stations as its third single on January 4, 2011.

Cover version and in popular culture
Japanese singer-songwriter Riri performed a cover of "Dilemma", which was included on her third extended play Summertime (2019). It featured Japanese rapper JP the Wavy, and was produced by DJ Chari and DJ Tatsuki, with the beat created by Zot on the Wave & Lil' Yukich. The song debuted at number one on the Japanese iTunes hip-hop chart. Both artists were familiar with the original song in their youth and decided to create a reinterpretation of it.

On the episode of Lip Sync Battle dated January 14, 2016, American actress Olivia Munn performed a lip sync of "Dilemma" while competing against actor Kevin Hart. Munn initially imitated Nelly's appearance by wearing a hat, bandana, and band-aid, but removed the accessories in order to portray Rowland. During season 21 of The Voice in the episode aired on October 12, 2021, two contestants on coach Ariana Grande's team competed in a cover performance of the song during the Battles round, which was positively received by the four coaches.

Track listings

US 12-inch single
 

UK 12-inch single

UK maxi single

Canadian CD single

Australian maxi single

European maxi single

Credits and personnel
Credits adapted from the back cover of "Dilemma".

 Lyrics written by K. Gamble, B. Sigler, Nelly
 Music written by Bam and Ryan Bowser
 Contains elements of "Love, Need and Want You"
 Produced by Bam and Ryan Bowser

Charts

Weekly charts

Year-end charts

Decade-end charts

Certifications

Release history

Papi Sánchez version

"Dilemma" was covered in Spanish by Dominican merengue artist Papi Sánchez, under the title "Dilema". It was released as the second single from his studio album Yeah Baby !! in 2004. "Dilema" peaked at number eight on the Belgium (Wallonia) chart dated May 28, 2005, where it remained for 14 weeks. The song charted at number 16 on the Belgium (Flanders) chart, and at number 20 on the French Syndicat National de l'Édition Phonographique (SNEP).

Track listing
Belgian CD single

French CD single

Charts

Weekly charts

Year-end charts

Sigma version

A remix of "Dilemma" was recorded by British production duo Sigma and released through 3 Beat Records on streaming and digital download formats on July 12, 2019. It contains tropical drum and bass beats, with a hi-NRG sound implemented in the chorus. An accompanying music video was released on August 2, 2019.

Release history

Notes

References

2000s ballads
2002 songs
2002 singles
Nelly songs
Kelly Rowland songs
Songs written by Nelly
Songs written by Kenny Gamble
Songs written by Bunny Sigler
Universal Records singles
Columbia Records singles
Pop ballads
Contemporary R&B ballads
Billboard Hot 100 number-one singles
Number-one singles in Australia
Number-one singles in Germany
Irish Singles Chart number-one singles
Dutch Top 40 number-one singles
Number-one singles in Scotland
Number-one singles in Switzerland
UK Singles Chart number-one singles
Male–female vocal duets
Music videos directed by Benny Boom
Grammy Award for Best Rap/Sung Collaboration
Sony BMG singles
Papi Sánchez songs
3 Beat Records singles